Macropoliana afarorum is a moth of the  family Sphingidae. It is known from Djibouti.

References

External links
Museum National d'Histoire Naturelle: Holotype of Macropoliana afarorum

Macropoliana
Moths described in 1975
Fauna of Djibouti